Laocoön, is a figure in Greek and Roman mythology and the Epic Cycle. Laocoon was a Trojan priest. He and his two young sons were attacked by giant serpents, sent by the gods. The story of Laocoön has been the subject of numerous artists, both in ancient and in more contemporary times.

Family
Laocoön was variously called as the son of Acoetes, Antenor, or Poseidon; or the son of Priam and Hecuba.
He had two sons.

Death

The most detailed description of Laocoön's grisly fate was provided by Quintus Smyrnaeus in Posthomerica, a later, literary version of events following the Iliad. According to Quintus, Laocoön begged the Trojans to set fire to the Trojan horse to ensure it was not a trick.

Athena, angry with him and the Trojans, shook the ground around Laocoön's feet and painfully blinded him. The Trojans, watching this unfold, assumed Laocoön was punished for the Trojans' mutilating and doubting Sinon, the undercover Greek soldier sent to convince the Trojans to let him and the horse inside their city walls. Thus, the Trojans wheeled the great wooden horse in. Laocoön did not give up trying to convince the Trojans to burn the horse.

According to one source, it was Athena who punished Laocoön even further, by sending two giant sea serpents to strangle and kill him and his two sons. Another version of the story says that it was Poseidon who sent the sea serpents to kill them. And according to Apollodorus, it was Apollo who sent the two sea serpents, because Laocoön had insulted Apollo by sleeping with his wife in front of his cult statue.

Virgil used the story in the Aeneid. According to Virgil, Laocoön advised the Trojans to not receive the horse from the Greeks. They were taken in by the deceitful testimony of Sinon and disregarded Laocoön's advice. The enraged Laocoön threw his spear at the Horse in response.

Minerva then sent sea serpents to strangle Laocoön and his two sons, Antiphantes and Thymbraeus, for his actions.
 "Laocoön, ostensibly sacrificing a bull to Neptune on behalf of the city (lines 201 ff.), becomes himself the tragic victim, as the simile (lines 223–224) makes clear. In some sense, his death must be symbolic of the city as a whole ..." — S.V. Tracy (1987)

According to the Hellenistic poet Euphorion of Chalcis, Laocoön was actually punished for procreating upon holy ground sacred to Poseidon; it was only unlucky timing that caused the Trojans to misinterpret his death as punishment for striking the horse with a spear, which they bring into the city with disastrous consequences.
The episode furnished the subject of Sophocles' lost tragedy, Laocoön.

In Aeneid, Virgil describes the circumstances of Laocoön's death:

{|
|-
| from the Aeneid
|    
| English translation
|    
| tr. Dryden
|-
| 
|    
| 
|    
| 
|}

Classical descriptions

The story of Laocoön is not mentioned by Homer, but it had been the subject of a tragedy, now lost, by Sophocles and was mentioned by other Greek writers, though the events around the attack by the serpents vary considerably. The most famous account of these is now in Virgil's Aeneid where Laocoön was a priest of Neptune (Poseidon), who was killed with both his sons after attempting to expose the ruse of the Trojan Horse by striking it with a spear.
 
Virgil gives Laocoön the famous line
 "Equō nē crēdite, Teucrī / Quidquid id est, timeō Danaōs et dōna ferentēs"
 
This quote is the source of the saying: "Beware of Greeks bearing gifts."

In Sophocles, however, he was a priest of Apollo who should have been celibate, but had married. The serpents killed only the two sons, leaving Laocoön himself alive to suffer. In other versions, he was killed for having committed an impiety by making love with his wife in the presence of a cult image in a sanctuary, or simply making a sacrifice in the temple with his wife present. In this second group of versions, the snakes were sent by Poseidon and in the first by Poseidon and Athena, or Apollo, and the deaths were interpreted by the Trojans as proof that the horse was a sacred object. The two versions have rather different morals: Laocoön was either punished for doing wrong, or for being right.

Later depictions
The death of Laocoön was famously depicted in a much-admired marble Laocoön and His Sons, attributed by Pliny the Elder to the Rhodian sculptors Agesander, Athenodoros, and Polydorus, which stands in the Vatican Museums, Rome. Copies have been executed by various artists, notably Baccio Bandinelli. These show the complete sculpture (with conjectural reconstructions of the missing pieces) and are located in Rhodes, at the Palace of the Grand Master of the Knights of Rhodes, Rome, the Uffizi Gallery in Florence and in front of the Archaeological Museum, Odessa, Ukraine, amongst others. Alexander Calder also designed a stabile which he called Laocoön in 1947; it's part of the Eli and Edyth Broad collection in Los Angeles.

The marble Laocoön provided the central image for Lessing's Laocoön, 1766, an aesthetic polemic directed against Winckelmann and the comte de Caylus. Daniel Albright reengages the role of the figure of Laocoön in aesthetic thought in his book Untwisting the Serpent: Modernism in Literature, Music, and Other Arts.

In Hector Berlioz's 1863 opera Les Troyens, the death of Laocoön is a pivotal moment of the first act after Aeneas' entrance, sung by eight singers and a double choir ("ottetto et double chœur"). It begins with the verse "Châtiment effroyable" ("frightful punishment").

 In addition to other literary references, John Barth employs a bust of Laocoön in his novella, The End of the Road.
 The R.E.M. song "Laughing" references Laocoön, rendering him female ("Laocoön and her two sons"), they also reference Laocoön in the song "Harborcoat".
 The comic book Asterix and the Laurel Wreath parodies statue's pose.
 American author Joyce Carol Oates also references Laocoön in her 1989 novel American Appetites.
 In Stave V of A Christmas Carol, by Charles Dickens (1843), Scrooge awakes on Christmas morning, "making a perfect Laocoon of himself with his stockings".
 Barbara Tuchman's The March of Folly begins with an extensive analysis of the Laocoön story.
 The American feminist poet and author Marge Piercy includes a poem titled, "Laocoön is the name of the figure", in her collection Stone, Paper, Knife (1983), relating love lost and beginning.
 John Steinbeck references Laocoön in his American literary classic East of Eden, referring to a picture of “Laocoön completely wrapped in snakes” when describing artwork hanging in classrooms at the Salinas schoolhouse.
 Sinclair Lewis references Laocoön in his novel Arrowsmith, remarking of a family argument that "general composition [was] remarkably like the Laocoön."

Namesakes
 3240 Laocoon, an asteroid named after Laocoön

Notes

Classical sources
Compiled by Tracy, which includes a fragmentary line possibly by Nicander:

References

Sources

External links
 
 
 
 

Mythological Greek seers
Characters in the Aeneid
Trojans
Deeds of Apollo
Deeds of Poseidon